This is a list of all United States Supreme Court cases from volume 524 of the United States Reports:

External links

1998 in United States case law